Dance of the Seven Veils is a 1970 British television film about German composer Richard Strauss. The film, which was directed by Ken Russell, was only screened once by the BBC. After it was condemned for its gratuitous sex scenes and the depiction of the composer as a Nazi sympathiser, the Estate of Richard Strauss took out a legal injunction banning the use of the composer's music on the film's soundtrack. In February 2020, with the expiration of the composer's copyright after more than 70 years since Strauss died, the film was shown at a special screening event in Cumbria, England hosted by Ken Russell's widow.

Plot

Cast
Christopher Gable 	... 	Richard Strauss
Judith Paris	... 	Pauline Strauss
Kenneth Colley 	... 	Hitler
Vladek Sheybal 	... 	Joseph Goebbels
James Mellor 	... 	Goering
Sally Bryant 	... 	'Life'
Gala Mitchell	... 	Fallen Woman
Rita Webb 	... 	Salome
Imogen Claire 	... 	Salome (dancer)
Maggy Maxwell 	... 	Potiphar's Wife
Otto Diamant 	... 	Jewish Man

Production
The film was made on location near Russell's home at Skiddaw in the Lake District. "One of the purposes of making the film was to shock complacent critics and viewers who sit in front of their sets for hours on end watching cocoa advertisements. I was simply setting out to make a film about Richard Strauss, and I felt that everything I showed was necessary for presenting my idea of this man," Russell told Peter Waymark of The Times in February 1970. "I wanted strong, hard outlines to bring out aspects of this man and his work that to my mind have been overlooked." The composer "was a self advertising, vulgar, commercial man."

Screening and reception
The film was shown on BBC1 on 15 February 1970. It created a sufficient outcry for 20 Conservative backbenchers to table a motion objecting to it after the television screening. It was shown at the House of Commons the following month. Huw Wheldon, then managing director of BBC Television who was present at the screening, defended the film. It was only shown once by the BBC. The Strauss estate was so outraged by the film that an injunction was taken out, banning the use of Strauss's music on the soundtrack, effectively preventing any further broadcasts because the film can be seen but it cannot be heard.

"I hated it so much" said The Observer. "I don't deny its power," wrote Nancy Banks-Smith in The Guardian. The campaigner Mary Whitehouse commented: "There was gratuitous sex and violence of the most outlandish kind".

When the copyright of Strauss' music expired, the film was reshown at Keswick Film Festival in Cumbria's Theatre by the Lake. The evening was hosted by Russell's widow, Lisi.

References

External links
Dance of the Seven Veils at IMDb
Dance of the Seven Veils at Letterbox DVD
Dance of the Seven Veils at BFI Screenonline

1970 television films
Films about composers
British television films
Films directed by Ken Russell